Gate of Heaven Cemetery is a cemetery located in East Hanover Township in Morris County, New Jersey, United States. The cemetery is operated under the auspices of the Roman Catholic Archdiocese of Newark. It opened in 1937 and had 81,000 burials through 2002. 100 of the cemetery's original  have been developed. Construction started in 1989 on Chapel Mausoleum, which was planned to include 10,000 crypts.

Notable burials

 Hugh Joseph Addonizio (1914–1981), New Jersey politician.
 Yogi Berra (1925–2015), Baseball Hall of Fame New York Yankee.
 Denise Borino-Quinn (1964–2010), actress
 Ownie Carroll (1902–1975), Major League Baseball pitcher.
 Eugene Francis Kinkead (1876–1960), New Jersey politician.
 Tony Mottola (1918–2004), guitarist who played with Frank Sinatra.
 Karen Ann Quinlan (1954–1985), right to die debate figure.
 Peter W. Rodino (1909–2005), U.S. congressman.
Anne Ryan (1889–1954), artist of the New York School of Abstract Expressionism
 Arthur Walsh (1896–1947), U.S. senator.

References

External links
 Search for burials in the Archdiocese of Newark database
 Gate of Heaven Cemetery
 

Cemeteries in Morris County, New Jersey
East Hanover Township, New Jersey
Roman Catholic Archdiocese of Newark
Roman Catholic cemeteries in New Jersey